Dom Afshan (also Romanized as Dom Afshān, Dam Afshān, and Domafshān) is a village in Ramjerd-e Yek Rural District, in the Central District of Marvdasht County, Fars Province, Iran. At the 2006 census, its population was 456, in 94 families.

References 

Populated places in Marvdasht County